The Austrian Littoral was a crown land (Kronland) of the Austrian Empire, established in 1849. It consisted of three regions: the Margraviate of Istria, Gorizia and Gradisca, and the Imperial Free City of Trieste. Throughout history, the region has been contested frequently, with parts of it controlled at various times by the Republic of Venice, Austria-Hungary, Italy, and Yugoslavia among others.

The Kingdom of Italy annexed greatest part of it after World War I according to the Treaty of London and later Treaty of Rapallo. After World War II, it was split between Italy (West) and Yugoslavia (East).

Trieste had strategic importance as Austria-Hungary's primary seaport and the coast of the Littoral was a resort destination, the Austrian Riviera. The region was a multi-national one, with Italians, Slovenes, Croats, Germans and Friulians being the main ethnic groups.

History 
The territory of the medieval Patriarchate of Aquileia had gradually been conquered by the Republic of Venice (Domini di Terraferma) until the early 15th century. In the east, the Habsburg archdukes of Austria, based on the March of Carniola they held from 1335, had gained Suzerainty over Istrian Pazin in 1374 and the port of Trieste in 1382. They also purchased Duino and Rijeka (Fiume) on the northern Adriatic coast in 1474, and inherited more territory in Friuli when the line of the Counts of Görz died out in 1500. In 1511, Emperor Maximilian I annexed the city of Gradisca from Venice.

The Habsburgs did little initially to consolidate or develop their holdings in the Littoral. The supremacy of the Republic of Venice in the Adriatic, and the attention to the threat posed by an expanding Ottoman Empire, gave the Austrian archdukes little opportunity to enlarge their coastal possessions. Incorporated into the Austrian Circle of the Holy Roman Empire, Görz, Trieste and Istria remained separately administered and retained their autonomy until the 18th century.

Emperor Charles VI increased the sea power of the Habsburg monarchy by making peace with the Ottomans and declaring free shipping in the Adriatic. In 1719, Trieste and Fiume were made free ports. In 1730, administration of the Littoral was unified under the Intendancy in Trieste. However, in 1775, Emperor Joseph II divided the administration of the two main ports, assigning Trieste as the port for the Austrian "hereditary lands" and Fiume for the Kingdom of Hungary. Shortly after, Trieste was merged with the Princely County of Gorizia and Gradisca in the north.

During the Napoleonic Wars, the Habsburg monarchy gained Venetian lands in the Istrian Peninsula and the Quarnero (Kvarner) Islands as part of the Treaty of Campo Formio of 1797. However, these territories and all of the new Austrian Empire's Adriatic lands were soon lost to the French Empire's puppet state, the Kingdom of Italy by the Treaty of Pressburg of 1805. The 1809 Treaty of Schönbrunn then transferred the area to the Illyrian Provinces which were directly ruled by France.

With Napoleon's defeats, the Austrian Empire regained the region. In 1813, all of the Littoral including Trieste, Gorizia and Gradisca, all of Istria, the Quarnero Islands, Fiume, and the hinterland of Fiume, Civil Croatia, including Karlstadt (Karlovac), became one administrative unit. From 1816, the Littoral was a part of the Austrian Empire's Kingdom of Illyria. In 1822, Fiume and Civil Croatia were separated from the territory and ceded to the Kingdom of Hungary (and in 1849 to Croatia).

The Littoral was officially the Trieste (Triest) Province, one of two provinces (or gouvernements) of the Kingdom, the other being Laibach (Ljubljana). It was subdivided into four districts (kreis): Gorizia (Görz; including Gorizia and the Julian March), Istria (Istrien; Eastern Istria and the Quarnero Islands), Trieste (Triest; the Trieste hinterland and Western Istria), and Trieste city (Triester Stadtgebiet).

Around 1825, the Littoral was reorganized into only two subdivisions: Istria with its capital at Mitterburg (Pisino/Pazin) and Gorizia with Trieste and its immediate surroundings under the direct control of the crown and separate from the local administrative structure.

In 1849, the Kingdom of Illyria was dissolved and the Littoral became a separate crown land with a governor in Trieste. It was formally divided into the Margravate of Istria and the Princely County (Gefürstete Grafschaft) of Gorizia and Gradisca with Trieste remaining separate from both.

By the 1861 February Patent, Gorizia and Gradisca and Istria became administratively separate entities and, in 1867, Trieste received separate status as well, and the Littoral was divided into the three crown lands of the Imperial Free City of Trieste and its suburbs, the Margraviate of Istria, and the Princely County of Gorizia and Gradisca, which each had separate administrations and Landtag assemblies, but were all subject to a k.k. statholder at Trieste.

Following the dissolution of Austria-Hungary, the Littoral fell within Italy's newly expanded borders as part of the Julian March. An area of similar extent under the name of Adriatic Littoral (Adriatisches Küstenland) was one of the operational zones of German forces during World War II after the capitulation of Italy in September 1943 until the end of the war. After World War II, most of it was included in the Second Yugoslavia.

Today Croatia and Slovenia each hold portions of the territory, and the city of Trieste remains under Italian rule. The name of the region lives on in its Slovene version, Primorska (Slovenian Littoral), a region of Slovenia.

Area and population 
Area:
 Gorizia and Gradisca: 2,918 km2
 Istria: 4,956 km2
 Triest: 95 km2

Population (1910 Census):
 Gorizia and Gradisca: 260,721 - 89.3 persons/km2
 Istria: 403,566 - 81.4 persons/km2
 Triest: 230,000 - 2414.8 persons/km2

Linguistic composition 
According to the last Austrian census of 1910 (1911 in Trieste), the Austrian Littoral was composed of the following linguistic communities:

Total:
 Italian: 356,676 (including estimated 60,000–75,000 Friulian language speakers) (39.85%)
 Slovene: 266.845 (29.82%)
 Serbo-Croatian: 170,706 (19.08%)
 German: 29,615 (3.31%)
 Other languages or unknown: 66,560 (7.44%)

Gorizia and Gradisca:
 Slovene: 154,564 (58%)
 Italian: 90,119 (including 60,000–75,000 Friulian-speakers) (36%)
 German: 4,486 (2%)

Trieste:
 Italian: 118,957 (51.85%)
 Slovene: 56,845 (24.78%)
 German: 11,856 (5.17%)
 Serbo-Croatian: 2,403 (1.05%)
 Other: 779 (0.34%)
 Non-Austrian citizens, among them 75% from Italy: 38,597 (16.82%)

Istria:
 Serbo-Croatian: 168,184 (43.5%)
 Italian: 147,417 (38.1%)
 Slovene: 55,134 (14.3%)
 German: 12,735 (3.3%)

The Austrian censuses did not count ethnic groups, nor the mother tongue, but the "language of daily interaction". Except for a small Serbian community in Trieste and the village of Peroj in Istria .

After 1880, Italian and Friulian languages were counted under one category, as Italian. The estimated number of Friulian speakers can be extrapolated from the Italian census of 1921, the only one in the 20th century when Friulian was counted as a distinct linguistic category. The Austrian Littoral had a large number of foreign nationals (around 71,000 or 7.9% of the overall population), which were not asked about their language of interaction. More than half of them resided in the city of Trieste. The majority were citizens of the Kingdom of Italy, followed by citizens of the Kingdom of Hungary (part of the Dual Monarchy) and the German Empire. It can be supposed that the majority of these foreign citizens were Italian speakers, followed by German, Croatian (from Rijeka and Croatia-Slavonia) and Slovene (from Venetian Slovenia), and Hungarian speakers.

Districts

Gorizia and Gradisca 
 Gorizia City (Stadt Görz)
 Gorizia (Görz Land)
 Gradisca
 Monfalcone (Falkenberg)
 Sežana (Sesana)
 Tolmin (Tolmein, Tolmino)

Istria 
 Koper (Capodistria)
 Krk (Veglia)
 Lošinj (Lussin)
 Poreč (Parenzo)
 Pazin (Mitterburg, Pisino)
 Pula (Pola)
 Volosko (Volosca)

See also 
 Austrian Riviera
 Battles of the Isonzo
 Croatian Littoral
 History of Trieste
 London Pact

References 

 
History of Austria-Hungary
States and territories established in 1813
Lands of the Empire of Austria (1867–1918)
States and territories disestablished in 1919
1919 disestablishments in Europe